Richard Carleton Green (April 26, 1953 – October 9, 2015) was an economist, specializing in financial economics. He was the Richard M. and Margaret S. Cyert Chair and Professor of Financial Economics at the Tepper School of Business at Carnegie Mellon University, US. Richard Green had previously been the editor of the Journal of Finance and was the only economist who served as president for all the three leading scholarly societies for financial economics: the American Finance Association (2006), the Western Finance Association (1999-2000), and the Society for Financial Studies (2012-2013).

Green was born on April 26, 1953. He attended Pomona College. He died in Pittsburgh, Pennsylvania on October 9, 2015.

References

Carnegie Mellon University faculty
Economists from California
Financial economists
Pomona College alumni
1953 births
2015 deaths
The Journal of Finance editors
Presidents of the American Finance Association